Opequon refers to several placenames in the Shenandoah Valley of Virginia and West Virginia, United States.

Opequon, Virginia is an unincorporated community in Frederick County, Virginia
Opequon Creek is a tributary stream of the Potomac River
Opequon Quaker Camp, a summer camp near Winchester, Virginia
Battle of Opequon was a battle fought in Winchester, Virginia during the American Civil War
Elmwood-on-the-Opequon is a historic residence on the National Register of Historic Places along Opequon Creek